Amanda "Amy" Ripley McClaren is a fictional character in the Alien franchise. The daughter of Ellen Ripley (main protagonist of the original film series, portrayed by Sigourney Weaver), the character is first mentioned and seen as an elderly woman in a photograph in the extended "special edition" of Aliens.

Amanda Ripley is also the protagonist of the 2014 video game Alien: Isolation, which is set approximately 15 years after Alien but around 40 years prior to Aliens. In the game, Amanda is in her mid-20s and is an engineer for the Weyland-Yutani Corporation (which was her mother's employer). She has continued searching for her long-lost mother, taking an assignment that enables her to visit the region of space in which her mother was last known to be in years earlier.

Conception and creation
A deleted scene from the 1986 theatrical version of Aliens, reinserted into the Special Edition first released in 1992, reveals that Ellen Ripley (played by Sigourney Weaver) has a daughter, Amanda. Amanda was still a child when Ellen travels into space before the events of Alien, though Ellen was scheduled to return to Earth in time for Amanda's 11th birthday. The events of the first Alien film prevented this, Amanda became an adult, married (taking on the surname McClaren), and died during her mother's 57-year stasis between the events of the first two films. A picture of Amanda as an elderly adult is shown to Ripley. The picture is one of Weaver's real-life mother, Elizabeth Inglis.

The scene was cut from the film due to 20th Century Fox's concerns about the film's length. Weaver was furious at the removal, considering it to be crucial to Ellen Ripley's character development in the film, taking on a protective mother role to the young character Rebecca "Newt" Jorden. In James Cameron's 1983 Alien II film treatment for what would become Aliens, Amanda (then unnamed) was alive, but old and crippled. When her mother contacted her from the Gateway Station, Amanda blames her for being absent for most of her life.

For the video game Alien: Isolation, most early development was done with a female test dummy, with it being "almost just an assumption" that the lead would be a female character. The game chose to focus on Amanda. The developers wanted Amanda to echo some of her mother's traits, while being her own distinct character. Examples given of how she mirrored Ellen Ripley included her determination, while also initially being colder than Ellen. Isolation utilised performance-capture acting in an attempt to bring believability to its characters.

Fictional biography

Amanda was conceived during a layover between haulage trips. Though this contravened Weyland-Yutani (W-Y) policy, her mother was not disciplined and the pregnancy was allowed to come to term. Amanda was delivered in a home birth, with her mother refusing anything for the pain, out of concern for years using cryo-drugs during trips in cryostasis.

She was ten years old when Ellen Ripley goes off into space aboard the Nostromo. According to the expanded universe novel Alien: Out of the Shadows, her father abandoned them, when Amanda was only 3 years old. According to the novelization of Aliens, Amanda's parents drifted apart and separated; with Ripley gaining custody. Before setting off on the Nostromo, and before the events of Alien, Ellen had promised Amanda that she would be back home in time for her 11th birthday.

In Alien: Isolation, Amanda Ripley is an engineer for W-Y who is approached by its synthetic, Christopher Samuels. Samuels informed her that the flight recorder of the Nostromo had been discovered by the salvage ship Anesidora and taken to the Sevastopol Station, a supply depot in orbit around the gas giant KG348. Believing that it will provide her closure, Amanda accepts a place on the recovery team, travelling on the W-Y ship Torrens.

According to Aliens, Amanda at some point married, taking on the surname McClaren, but had no children. She died on December 23, 2178 from cancer. Ripley was cremated and interred at Westlake Repository, Little Chute, Wisconsin.

According to the non-canon novel, Alien: Original Sin, Ripley-8, in looking further into Amanda's life, learned that she had worked as a reporter.

Reception
The character's critical reception was mixed. Despite criticizing much of Isolation, Ryan McCaffrey from IGN stated that Amanda has a "clearly defined tough-as-nails personality befitting of her mother." Danielle Riendeau of Polygon praised Amanda from a feminist perspective as a worthy successor to, as well as the best female protagonist since Ellen Ripley. Riendeau would later go on to call 2014 "the year women characters rule" for the number of prominent women in video games, further praising the game's ability to tie playing Amanda into its gameplay.

Wireds Matt Peckham criticised the choice to have the player character as Ellen's daughter, calling it a "narrative cheat," and found the ultimate pay-off "hurried and a little forced." Peckham praised having a female player character though, and wrote: "It's wonderful playing as a strong, clever, self-reliant woman, and a testament to the game and character that I stopped caring Amanda was Ellen's daughter an hour or two in, but surely such traits extend beyond the Ripley gene pool."

Jeff Marchiafava from Game Informer criticised the character, feeling that she "exhibits little growth or personality." Blake Peterson, writing for Game Revolution, felt the game failed to ever develop Amanda or connect the player to her emotionally, commenting that she "soon feels like a placeholder" for the more iconic Ellen Ripley.

Appearances
 Aliens – Special Edition (1986)
 Aliens (novel) (1986)
 Aliens: Female War (comic) (1990)
 Aliens: Female War (novel) (1993)
 Alien Resurrection (novel) (1997)
 Alien: Isolation (2014)
 Alien: Isolation (comic) (2014)
 Alien: Out of the Shadows (novel) (2014)
 Alien: Sea of Sorrows (novel) (2014)
 Alien: The Weyland-Yutani Report (2014)
 Aliens vs. Pinball (video game) (2016)
 Aliens: Defiance (comic) (2016-2017)
 Alien: Blackout (mobile game) (2019)
 Alien: Isolation – The Digital Series (2019)
 Alien: Isolation (novel) (2019)
 Aliens: Resistance (comic) (2019)
 Aliens: Rescue (comic) (2019)

Notes

References

Alien (franchise) characters
Female characters in video games
Fictional cryonically preserved characters
Fictional engineers
Fictional female engineers
Fictional people from the 22nd-century
Film characters introduced in 1986
First-person shooter characters
Orphan characters in video games
Science fiction film characters
Science fiction video game characters
Sega protagonists
Time travelers
Video game characters introduced in 2014